Jenelle Hutcherson (born November 15, 1985) is an American  hair artist, activist, public figure, designer, youth mentor and visionary. She is best known for being the first openly lesbian contestant and the first contestant to wear a tuxedo in the Miss Long Beach 2011 pageant in Long Beach, CA, and the Miss California USA pageant in Palm Desert, CA 2012. Her participation in the pageants shattered stereotypes in many angles; feminist groups, women who have never fit in society's ideal of what beauty is, butch women embracing themselves (tuxedo and swimsuit/ she tailored and sewn her own for both pageants), the standard that only feminine women enter pageants, and that women from minority descent don't win pageants.

Hutcherson became a name in the LGBT community, the pageant community, and made headline news in media such as NBC, CBS, KCAL9, Huffington Post, After Ellen, The Advocate, NOH8 Campaign, Courage Campaign, GLAAD, SDGLN (San Diego Gay and Lesbian News), Curve Magazine, GreaterLongBeach.com, Press-Telegram, and Los Angeles Times. The campaign of "Vote for Jenelle" went international after AfterEllen.com published an article about Hutcherson in September 2011.

Biography 

Hutcherson is of Native-American, Mexican, Spanish, and Tennessean descent. She grew up in Wasco, CA where her father and mother owned their own business (Golden Empire Fire Protection). She attended grade school in the public school system and at middle school transitioned over to a private school of Christian organization.

At 10 years old her father died of AIDS. He did not contract the disease the way most assumed at that time out of ignorance, but rather from the dentist office. Shortly after his death, her mother moved both her and her brother to Bakersfield, CA. There she raised sheep and horses with her family in the local 4-H Club.

In middle school, Jenelle was bullied for having gained quite a bit of weight and could not afford name brand clothing classmates wore. Her mother, being the sole provider of the family, did what she could to continue to have a balanced family life at home for both her and her brother. 
In high school, at age 16 she came out, she knew that she was gay and had known since she was 5 years old. In high school, she was treated hastily for letting her sexuality and who she was be known, as well as for standing up for herself.

Her mother questioned things of why she felt this way and even suggested counseling (although she would be a great source of support for Jenelle).  Her grandmother was a hairstylist and inspired her to go to school to earn a cosmetology license. She then assisted a well-known artist in the area at Afif Hair International for four years. In beauty school, she was faced with more adversity, as she was scrutinized by the owner for being openly gay and even was told that she would never make it as a hairstylist by one of the instructors.

Through all of the time of being treated unfairly, Jenelle admits she grew angry and hateful towards everyone and herself. She admits to having allowed herself to become exactly what these people were to her when she was younger, a bully. This attitude led to dependency on hurting others, and loss of self-respect, which led to drugs and alcohol. Jenelle has stated, "There comes a point in all of our lives that we must take responsibility for who we are and the energy we put out in the world." This was her turning point, to quit living her life as an adult bully and use her energy God gave her for good; to help, not to hurt and spread hate. A saying her mother would always tell her resonated with her at this time: "You have the choice to use your power for good or not good."

She relocated to Long Beach in 2008 to work in downtown for The Den Salon. She was successful in building a large clientele within her first year and helped to build the business from the ground up alongside the salon owners, Andrew and Allison Kripp. The Den Salon took her in under their wing and helped her to grow as an artist and as an individual. Now working as the Den Salon's Lead Artist, the salon and staff have become like family. Together, as a tight-knit team of amazing artists and as a strong business in downtown, they tackle the challenge to do their part to help build a network of "fresh face" local businesses within the Downtown Long Beach area led by the Downtown Long Beach Association (DLBA).

In October 2010, while working at The Den Salon, just 2 weeks before the 2011 title would be given to Monique Villa, Justin Rudd, the director of Miss Long Beach and Southern California Cities Pageant, and Jenelle had an epic conversation that would forever change the way the world looks at pageants, women, the LGBT community and Long Beach. Rudd asked Hutcherson if she would be interested in entering the Miss Long Beach pageant. She said that there was only one way she would be a part of such an event and that was as herself. Justin and Jenelle discussed wardrobe, (tuxedo and swimwear), and as a result it was decided that she could not do this until the next year (November 2011 for 2012 title) being that it would be different from what many originally signed up for and that it would change the pageant world in Long Beach and soon California.

As a mentor for the Mentoring Youth Through Empowerment (MYTE) program for ages 13–18 at the Center of Downtown Long Beach, and standing for all of the bullying and the under-lying negative attitude toward the gay community, Jenelle was ready to take a stand in the pageant world. Being very sure of who she was,J enelle hoped to set an example and make people more aware of who they are. Especially those opposed and uneducated about LGBT youth and the community.

Her work and vision has since inspired many, and her story of entering the pageant world with a real purpose has reached around the world. After pioneering and seeing the response, Jenelle just had to enter the Miss California USA 2012 pageant in order to reach more people. "To open at least one adult's mind or give one child hope. To teach more about Love and less about Hate. To overall inspire and create." These were words that would echo throughout the community.

Now as a mentor at the LGBTQ Center of downtown Long Beach MYTE Program, a well-known hair artist specializing in Three-Dimensional haircut/color, a designer for her own tuxedo line and swimwear line, a Scholarship for Tuxedos program in her name, and a pioneer as being the first openly gay pageant participant in local and state history (Miss Long Beach Nov.2011/Miss California USA Jan. 2012) she has succeeded in overcoming the obstacles she has faced, as well as becoming a good example to youth.

References 

 Kathleen Miles. "Long Beach Contestant Makes History" . HuffingtonPost.com Retrieved 1-16-2012
 Sandy Chase. "Lesbian Jenelle Hutcherson to Break Tradition"  San Diego Gay and Lesbian News  Retrieved 1-16-2012
 Woman is Long Beach's First Openly Gay Pageant Contestant  Los Angeles Times Retrieved 1-16-2012
 NBC Los Angeles Retrieved 1-16-2012
GLAAD Article  Retrieved 1-16-2012

External links

KTLA Story on Jenelle

1985 births
Living people
Beauty pageant contestants from California
American LGBT artists
LGBT people from California
People from Bakersfield, California